Zrarda is a town in Taza Province, Fès-Meknès, Morocco. According to the 2004 census it has a population of 3,680.

References

Populated places in Taza Province